A medbed (an abbreviation of "medical bed" or "meditation bed") is a type of medical treatment involving a bed imbued with a supposed healing energy. The scientific veracity of such a device is a regarded as pseudoscientific.

Medbeds have been the subject of conspiracy theories involving claims that the devices are utilised by members of a 'deep state' and billionaires and that the former President of the United States, John F. Kennedy, is still alive, lying on a medbed. Claiming those devices exist is popular among QAnon influencers such as Michael Protzman, Romana Didulo and YamatoQ.

Various companies exist that allow paying customers to lie on such a bed, with claims of healing ailments, albeit with disclosures on their websites that no diagnoses, treatment or cures are offered by them.

References

Beds
Energy therapies
Alternative medical treatments